Wayne Gretzky Hockey 3 is a 1992 ice hockey-themed sports game developed and published by Bethesda Softworks.

Gameplay
The game offers a 3/4 view of the players.

Gretzky Gold: The Collector's Edition
A package containing the game and Hockey League Simulator 2 was released in August 1993. In addition to both games, the package includes a photo of Wayne Gretzky himself.

Reception

PC Player rated the game a 65 of 100 stating that "Occasional sports players should also be warned about the third Wayne Gretzky program. The ice hustle and bustle seems a bit too hectic and tiring if you don't really want to “get used to it”. Ice hockey fans who can delight in features such as the line-up editor are offered the currently most competent simulation of this sport on PCs"

Power Play magazine rated the game a 92 of 100 stating that "Wayne Gretzky Hockey 3 is without a doubt the best ice hockey simulation for PC. Like its predecessors, the game correctly adheres to the ice hockey rules and offers fans a realistic simulation of their favorite sport. Thanks to a flood of options, both beginners and ice hockey veterans will have a lot of fun with it. For example, the speed can be regulated continuously or the referee declared a blind hen. Graphically, Wayne Gretzky Hockey 3 shines in previously unfamiliar VGA splendor. The new 3-D perspective in particular is beautifully drawn. The players are very nicely animated, but without a fast computer they run across the ice with chills. Music and sound effects have also increased tremendously in quality and quantity compared to their predecessors."

Sales
The game was regarded by Christopher Weaver in 1997 as one of the most popular Bethesda Softworks titles along with The Terminator 2029 and the Elder Scrolls series.

References 

1992 video games
Bethesda Softworks games
DOS games
DOS-only games
Ice hockey video games
Video games based on real people
Video games developed in the United States
Video game sequels
Wayne Gretzky games